Pascal Delbrouck (born 30 March 1959) is a retired Belgian footballer who played as a midfielder.

Honours

Club 
Standard Liège

 Belgian First Division: 1981–82, 1982–83
 Belgian Cup: 1980–81
 Belgian Super Cup: 1981
 Belgian League Cup: 1975
 European Cup Winners' Cup: 1981-82 (runners-up)
 Intertoto Cup Group Winners: 1980, 1982, 1984

References 

1959 births
Living people
Belgian footballers
Standard Liège players
Association footballers not categorized by position